Richard Ernest Brown (January 17, 1935 – April 17, 1970) was an American professional baseball catcher who played in Major League Baseball (MLB) for the Cleveland Indians, Chicago White Sox, Detroit Tigers and Baltimore Orioles. The native of Shinnston, West Virginia, attended Florida State University. His brother Larry Brown had a 12-year MLB career (1963–74) as an infielder with four American League teams.

Originally signed by the Indians in 1953, Dick Brown made his big league debut on June 20, 1957 against the Boston Red Sox at the age of 22. After three seasons with the Indians, he was traded to the Chicago White Sox on December 6, 1959, along with Don Ferrarese, Minnie Miñoso and Jake Striker for Norm Cash, Bubba Phillips and Johnny Romano.

Brown caught for six pitchers who would eventually be inducted into the Baseball Hall of Fame. He played in 636 games over nine seasons, hitting .244 with 62 home runs and 223 runs batted in. His best two seasons were the two he spent with Detroit: he hit 16 home runs in 1961 and 12 home runs in 1962. He had a career .989 fielding percentage. Career highlights include back-to-back-to-back home runs he hit with Norm Cash and Steve Boros on May 23, 1961. He hit a grand slam less than one month earlier on April 29.

He played his final game on October 3, 1965. He had been expected to continue as the Orioles' starting catcher entering the 1966 season, but the discovery of a brain tumor early in spring training necessitated surgery to remove it on March 7. Additional surgery  weeks later revealed another brain tumor, an inoperable one that effectively ended Brown's playing career and cost him his life. He served as a scout for the Orioles until his death at age 35 in Baltimore in 1970.

References

External links

 Dick Brown at SABR (Baseball BioProject)

1935 births
1970 deaths
Baltimore Orioles players
Baltimore Orioles scouts
Baseball players from West Virginia
Buffalo Bisons (minor league) players
Burials in Florida
Chicago White Sox players
Cleveland Indians players
Deaths from brain cancer in the United States
Deaths from cancer in Maryland
Detroit Tigers players
Florida State Seminoles baseball players
Green Bay Bluejays players
Major League Baseball catchers
Miami Marlins (IL) players
Mobile Bears players
Omaha Cardinals players
People from Shinnston, West Virginia
Reading Indians players
Sherbrooke Indians players
Spartanburg Peaches players
Almendares (baseball) players
American expatriate baseball players in Cuba